Captain Earl McNabb Hand   (10 March 1897 – 19 March 1954) was a Canadian World War I flying ace credited with five confirmed aerial victories and two unconfirmed ones.

Biography

Early life 
Hand was born in Saint Ste. Marie, the son of Thomas A. Hand and Hannah Jane Hand.

Military service 
Hand joined the Canadian Expeditionary Force on April 7, 1916. Soon, he was sent to France's Western Front.

Hand began his victory roll while flying a Sopwith Camel for 45 Squadron. He tallied his first win when he drove an Albatros D.V down out of control at Langemark-Poelkapelle, Belgium on 15 November 1917. After 45 Squadron shifted from the Western Front to Italy, Hand had a couple of unconfirmed claims on 11 January 1918; he then scored four times between 30 January and 9 May 1918. A summary of his victories shows four destroyed enemy airplanes, one confirmed and two unconfirmed driven down out of control. On 1 June 1918, Hand was shot down by Austro-Hungarian ace Frank Linke-Crawford. Linke-Crawford hit the gas tank of Hand's Camel and set it afire; somehow, Hand survived both the flames and the impact of the crash. However, he was badly burned and taken prisoner.

Later life 
Hand was repatriated in 1919 and returned to Canada. He became a magistrate. He also helped found the Toronto Flying Club.

Sources of information

References
Above the Trenches: a Complete Record of the Fighter Aces and Units of the British Empire Air Forces 1915-1920. Christopher F. Shores, Norman L. R. Franks, Russell Guest. Grub Street, 1990. , .

1897 births
1954 deaths
People from Sault Ste. Marie, Ontario
Canadian World War I flying aces
Recipients of the Distinguished Flying Cross (United Kingdom)